The Embassy of Togo in Washington, D.C. is the diplomatic mission of the Togolese Republic to the United States. It is located at 2208 Massachusetts Avenue, Northwest, Washington, D.C., in the Embassy Row neighborhood.

The current ambassador is Frédéric Hegbe.

See also
 Togo–United States relations

References

External links

Official website

Togo
Washington, D.C.
Togo–United States relations
Togo